Radivoje Brajović (born 11 January 1935 in Peć, Kingdom of Yugoslavia) was the President of the Presidency of the Socialist Republic of Montenegro from May 1986 to May 1988 and the President of its Executive Council in 1982–1986. He was a member of the League of Communists of Montenegro and the League of Communists of Yugoslavia.

In October 1988 Brajović announced his resignation from the collective leadership of Montenegro after the Anti-bureaucratic revolution organised by Slobodan Milošević.

References

1935 births
Living people
Politicians from Peja
Presidents of Montenegro
Date of birth missing (living people)
League of Communists of Montenegro politicians
Montenegrin communists